Cash in the Attic is a British television programme that aired on BBC One from 4 November 2002 to 24 May 2012. The programme's tagline was The show that helps you find hidden treasures in your home, and then sells them for you at auction. The show was revived by Channel 5 in November 2021 for broadcast in 2022.

Format
In the show, the presenter visited a family's house to find out what they need to raise money for. They then explored the house and its surroundings, finding antiques and valuing them, with the help of experts. The family then goes to auction with the aim of making their financial target. The auction never takes place on the same day as the rummage; often it can take place several weeks later.

Presenters and experts

During its run on the BBC the show was hosted by presenters including Angela Rippon, Jennie Bond, Gloria Hunniford, Lorne Spicer, Ben Fogle, Chris Hollins, Aled Jones, Alistair Appleton, Angus Purden, Jules Hudson. In 2021, Hudson, already a presenter of a number of Channel 5 shows based at Cannon Hall Farm (such as Winter on the Farm), was hired to present a new series of Cash in the Attic alongside Chris Kamara, a series which will be shown on Channel 5 on weekdays from 1 August 2022. The antiques experts include Paul Hayes, Jessica Wall, David Fergus, Jessica Forrester  and Kayleigh Davies.

The antiques experts for the previous BBC series included Paul Hayes, Jonty Hearnden, John Cameron and James Rylands.

Transmissions

BBC

Regular series

Celebrity series

Channel 5

References

External links

 
 Cash in the Celebrity Attic
 

2002 British television series debuts
BBC high definition shows
BBC Television shows
Channel 5 (British TV channel) original programming
English-language television shows
British television series revived after cancellation